Mississippi Highway 14 (MS 14) is a  state highway that runs from west to east in the U.S. State of Mississippi. MS 14 serves the counties of Issaquena, Sharkey, Humphreys, Holmes, Attala, Winston, and Noxubee. MS 14 exists in two sections. The first section runs from west to east, beginning at Levee Road in Mayersville and ending at a junction with MS 149 near Louise. The second section begins at Ebenezer Coxburg Road / Ebenezer Road in Ebenezer and runs eastward to the Mississippi/Alabama state line near Macon where it continues as Alabama State Route 32 (SR 32).

Route description

Western segment

MS 14 begins in Issaquena County in Mayersville at a fork in the road at an intersection with Levee Road, not even a half mile from the banks of the Mississippi River (one can access the river via this gravel road). The highway heads east straight through the center of town along Court Street, where it has an intersection and becomes concurrent with MS 1 (part of the Great River Road). They head northeast as a two-lane highway to leave Mayersville and pass through  rural farmland for several miles to an intersection where MS 1 (Great River Road) splits off and heads north toward Greenville. MS 14 heads due east through more flat farmland to cross Newsom Bayou before entering Sharkey County at a bridge over a small creek.

MS 14 passes along the northern edge of Indian Bayou State Wildlife Management Area before entering the Rolling Fork city limits as Race Street. It has a junction with MS 826 and passes by the town's hospital before passing through neighborhoods, where it crosses Deer Creek, and along the southern edge of downtown to come to an intersection with US 61. The highway becomes concurrent with US 61 and they head north to have an intersection with MS 16 (McLaurin Street) before passing through a business district. US 61/MS 14 have an intersection with Rosenwald Avenue (former/connector to the other section of MS 16) before leaving Rolling Fork and passing through flat farmland for several miles. The highway now enters Anguilla, with MS 14 splitting off and heading east at the eastern edge of downtown. MS 14 crosses the Sunflower River before passing along the northern edge of the Delta National Forest and entering Humphreys County.

MS 14 passes through rural flat farmland for several miles before coming to an end at the very northern edge of Louise at an intersection with MS 149.

This entire western segment of MS 14 lies entirely within the Mississippi Delta region.

Eastern segment

MS 14 begins again in Holmes County at a four-way stop in the community of Ebenezer. It heads east as a two-lane highway through farmland and wooded areas for a  few miles to pass through Richland, where it has a short concurrency with MS 17 and an interchange with I-55 (Exit 146). The highway now passes through the town of Goodman, where it passes by the Goodman campus of Holmes Community College and has an intersection with US 51, before crossing the Big Black River into Attala County.

MS 14 passes eastward through a mix of farmland and woodlands for the next several miles, where it has a concurrency with MS 429, before becoming concurrent with MS 43 and the two head north to enter the Kosciusko outskirts. MS 14 splits off at an intersection with S Natchez Street and the highway heads east to bypass the town along its south side as it passes over the Natchez Trace Parkway (without an interchange) and crosses the Yockanookany River.  MS 14 now travels through neighboring Williamsville, where it becomes concurrent with MS 19 at an intersection with MS 35, as well as having an intersection with MS 736, before leaving the Kosciusko area. MS 19 splits off after a few miles and MS 14 continues east through remote woodlands for several miles, where it has an intersection with Hanna Road (proposed MS 411 extension) before entering Winston County.

MS 14 continues east through woodlands to have an intersection with MS 15/MS 25 before passing straight through downtown Louisville, where it has an intersection with MS 397 (S Church Avenue). The highway now leaves Louisville and passes through farmland for several miles before re-entering woodlands to cross into Noxubee County.

MS 14  passes through Mashulaville, where it has an intersection with MS 490, before passing through some farmland and becoming concurrent with MS 145. They head north to cross the Noxubee River into Macon, with MS 14 splitting off in downtown. MS 14 has an intersection with US 45 before leaving Macon and passing rural farmland for several miles to come to the Alabama state line, where the road continues into that state as Alabama State Route 32 (SR 32).

Major intersections

References

External links

Magnolia Meanderings

014
Transportation in Issaquena County, Mississippi
Transportation in Sharkey County, Mississippi
Transportation in Humphreys County, Mississippi
Transportation in Holmes County, Mississippi
Transportation in Attala County, Mississippi
Transportation in Winston County, Mississippi
Transportation in Noxubee County, Mississippi